White Noise is an English experimental electronic music band formed in London in 1968, after American-born David Vorhaus, a classical bass player with a background in physics and electronic engineering, attended a lecture by Delia Derbyshire, a sound scientist at the BBC Radiophonic Workshop. Derbyshire and Brian Hodgson, then both former members of electronic music project Unit Delta Plus, joined Vorhaus to form the band.

Biography

An Electric Storm
In June 1969 White Noise released the groundbreaking album An Electric Storm on Island Records. The album was created using a variety of tape manipulation techniques, and used the first British synthesizer, the EMS Synthi VCS3. Amongst many oddities, the first track on the album, Love Without Sound, employed sped-up tape edits of Vorhaus playing the double bass to create violin and cello sounds. Although not initially commercially successful for Island, the album is now considered an important and influential album in the development of electronic music, namechecked by contemporary artists like The Orb and Julian Cope, influencing contemporary acts such as Broadcast, Add N to (X), and Secret Chiefs 3. Peter Kember of Spacemen 3 included 'Firebird' on his 2004 curated compilation Spacelines.

White Noise 2-III-IV-V
Following the departure of Derbyshire and Hodgson, to pursue other projects, Vorhaus released a second album, the largely instrumental White Noise 2 - Concerto for Synthesizer on Virgin Records in 1974. It was recorded in his own studio in Camden, North London. The album further utilized the EMS VCS 3, as well as prototype sequencers. A third album, the single track 'space fantasy' White Noise III - Re-Entry was released by Pulse Records in 1980. A further two albums were released, the atmospheric White Noise IV  - Inferno (AMP Music) (1990) incorporated the use of samples, and White Noise V  - Sound Mind (AMP Music; 2000), an experiment in what Vorhaus called "dark ambient".

Members
Current
David Vorhaus (1968–present)
Mike Painter (2011–present)

Former
Delia Derbyshire (1968–1969)
Brian Hodgson (1968–1969)
Paul Lytton (1968–1969)
 John Whitman (1968–1969)
 Annie Bird (1968–1969)
 Val Shaw (1968–1969)
 Mark Jenkins (2005–2011)

Discography
Albums
An Electric Storm (1969)
White Noise 2 - Concerto for Synthesizer (1974)
White Noise 3 - Re-Entry (1980)
White Noise 4 - Inferno (1990)
White Noise 5 - Sound Mind (2000)
White Noise 5.5 - White Label (2006)

References

External links
 Head Heritage  - review of An Electric Storm
 Myspace site of Mark Jenkins
 

British electronic music groups
Island Records artists
Virgin Records artists